Mike or Michael Everitt may refer to:

 Michael Everitt (brn 1968), British Anglican priest
 Mike Everitt (baseball) (born 1964), Major League Baseball umpire
 Mike Everitt (footballer) (born 1941), association football player and coach